Sergei Mukhin (born 1959) is a Russian mathematician, Professor, Dr.Sc., a professor at the Faculty of Computer Science at the Moscow State University.

He graduated from the faculty MSU CMC (1981). Works at Moscow State University since 1984.

He defended the thesis "Mathematical modeling of hemodynamics" for the degree of Doctor of Physical and Mathematical Sciences (2009).

Author of 3 books and more than 80 scientific articles.

References

Bibliography

External links
 Annals of the Moscow University
 MSU CMC
 Scientific works of Sergei Mukhin
 Scientific works of Sergei Mukhin

Russian computer scientists
Russian mathematicians
Living people
Academic staff of Moscow State University
1959 births
Moscow State University alumni